The anti-griddle is a kitchen appliance that flash freezes or semi-freezes foods placed on its chilled metal top. The device was inspired by a similar appliance used by Grant Achatz in one of his restaurants.

Chef and Top Chef guest judge Grant Achatz used a similar device in his first Chicago restaurant Alinea, which he invented with the help of culinary technologist Philip Preston. The device is about the size of a microwave oven. He collaborated with the company Polyscience to mass-produce the anti-griddle for use at homes and other restaurants.

Operation
The anti-griddle maintains a constant temperature of -30°F (c. -34.4°C) by pumping a refrigerant through a compressor to remove heat from its steel surface. Liquids, oil, and gels generally freeze in 30 to 90 seconds. The            finished product has a crunchy outer texture while the inside remains soft or creamy.

See also

 List of cooking techniques
 Molecular gastronomy

References

Kitchenware
Cooling technology